The 2012 European Aquatics Championships were held from 14 to 27 May 2012 in Debrecen, Hungary and Eindhoven, Netherlands. The 2012 European Swimming Championships were to take place in Antwerp, Belgium, but were reallocated to the City of Debrecen and were held on the same dates as previously planned, from 21 to 27 May. The Diving Championships were held in Eindhoven from 15 to 20 May. The Synchronised Swimming discipline, originally intended to take place in Antwerp, have also been reallocated, with its continental titles having been contested in Eindhoven.
Originally, the Championships had been awarded to Vienna, but later they backed out due to the Great Recession.

The 2012 European Water Polo Championships were held separately a few months earlier, from 16 to 29 January, also in Eindhoven, Netherlands.

Schedule 
Competition dates by discipline were:
 Swimming: 21–27 May (Debrecen)
 Diving: 15–20 May (Eindhoven)
 Synchro: 23–27 May (Eindhoven)
 Water Polo: 16–29 January (Eindhoven)

Medal table

Swimming

Results

Men's events

Women's events

Medal table

Diving

Results

Men's events

Women's events

Team events

Medal table

Synchronised swimming

Results

Medal table

See also 
 LEN European Aquatics Championships
 List of European Championships records in swimming
 Ligue Européenne de Natation (LEN)
 2011 World Aquatics Championships
 2013 World Aquatics Championships

References

External links 
 
 

 
E
LEN European Aquatics Championships
2012 European Aquatics Championships
2012 European Aquatics Championships
European Aquatics Championships
European Aquatics Championships
2012 European Aquatics Championships
2012 European Aquatics Championships
Swimming competitions in Hungary
Swimming competitions in the Netherlands
May 2012 sports events in Europe
21st century in Eindhoven